Jimmy Webster (born 28 June 1993) is a professional Australian rules footballer who plays the St Kilda Football Club in the Australian Football League (AFL). He was recruited by the club in the 2011 National Draft, with pick #42. Webster made his debut in Round 7, 2013, against  at Docklands Stadium.

References

External links

1993 births
Living people
St Kilda Football Club players
Australian rules footballers from Tasmania
Glenorchy Football Club players
Sandringham Football Club players